The Desperate Hours is a crime novel by the American writer Robert Aiello set in contemporary Pittsburgh, Pennsylvania.

It opens when a psychopath with a score to settle with Grant Montgomery kidnaps his girlfriend. Both the police and Montgomery race against time find the woman alive and to rescue her.

Sources
Contemporary Authors Online. The Gale Group, 2006.

External links
 Author's website

2005 American novels
American crime novels
Novels set in Pittsburgh